Fernando 'Nando' Có (born 8 October 1973 in Canchungo, Guinea-Bissau) is a Bissau-Guinean former footballer. Besides Portugal, he has played in Malaysia, Luxembourg, and Spain.

Career

In 1997, he signed for Racing Santander.
In 1998, he signed for CD Numancia. 

Signed by Sarawak of the Malaysia Super League in 2004 to partner Ghanaian Robert Eshun up front, Manuel Có starred in the club's first win of the season in May, striking a brace to beat Sabah 3-1. Treated as a hero after the match, his first goal was scored off a penalty that game and his second came in the 18th minute that game, allaying players fears of a loss; however, the forward was booked for  taking off his shirt after converting the penalty. Shown their third yellow card that season, Manuel Có and Eshun were suspended for one match in August.

International goals
Scores and results list Guinea-Bissau's goal tally first.

References

La Liga players
Bissau-Guinean footballers
Bissau-Guinean expatriate footballers
Bissau-Guinean expatriates in Malaysia
Association football forwards
1973 births
Living people
Guinea-Bissau international footballers
Sarawak FA players
Malaysia Super League players
Expatriate footballers in Malaysia
Expatriate footballers in Spain
Expatriate footballers in Portugal
Portuguese sportspeople of Bissau-Guinean descent
Vitória F.C. players
Racing de Santander players
CD Numancia players
CD Toledo players
Leça F.C. players
odivelas F.C. players
expatriate footballers in Luxembourg